The Volvo LV71-series was a medium size truck produced by Swedish automaker Volvo between 1932 and 1935.

History
Volvo introduced the LV71-series in the spring of 1932. The truck was built on two different wheelbases: 3.4 and 4.1 m. There were two weight classes: LV71 and LV72 with a payload of 2.5 tonnes and LV73 and LV74 with a payload of 3 tonnes.

The medium-sized truck series also included Volvo's first forward control truck, LV75. The cab was moved forward so that the driver sat beside the engine instead of the gear box like a conventional truck. This gives a better weight distribution between the front and rear axle, resulting in reduced rear axle load.

Gallery

References

External links 

 Volvo Trucks Global - history
 Swedish brass cars - picture gallery
 Volvo Trucks Databank 

LV71
Vehicles introduced in 1932